A physical property is any property that is measurable, whose value describes a state of a physical system. The changes in the physical properties of a system can be used to describe its changes between momentary states. Physical properties are often referred to as observables. They are not modal properties. A quantifiable physical property is called physical quantity.

Physical properties are often characterized as intensive and extensive properties. An intensive property does not depend on the size or extent of the system, nor on the amount of matter in the object, while an extensive property shows an additive relationship. These classifications are in general only valid in cases when smaller subdivisions of the sample do not interact in some physical or chemical process when combined.

Properties may also be classified with respect to the directionality of their nature. For example, isotropic properties do not change with the direction of observation, and anisotropic properties do have spatial variance.

It may be difficult to determine whether a given property is a material property or not.  Color, for example, can be seen and measured; however, what one perceives as color is really an interpretation of the reflective properties of a surface and the light used to illuminate it. In this sense, many ostensibly physical properties are called supervenient. A supervenient property is one which is actual, but is secondary to some underlying reality. This is similar to the way in which objects are supervenient on atomic structure. A cup might have the physical properties of mass, shape, color, temperature, etc., but these properties are supervenient on the underlying atomic structure, which may in turn be supervenient on an underlying quantum structure.

Physical properties are contrasted with chemical properties which determine the way a material behaves in a chemical reaction.

List of properties
The physical properties of an object that are traditionally defined by classical mechanics are often called mechanical properties. Other broad categories, commonly cited, are electrical properties, optical properties, thermal properties, etc. Examples of physical properties include:

 absorption (physical)
 absorption (electromagnetic)
 albedo
 angular momentum
 area
 brittleness
 boiling point
 capacitance
 color
 concentration
 density
 dielectric
 ductility
 distribution
 efficacy
 elasticity
 electric charge
 electrical conductivity
 electrical impedance
 electric field
 electric potential
 emission
 flow rate (mass)
 flow rate (volume)
 fluidity
 frequency
 hardness
 heat capacity
 inductance
 intrinsic impedance
 intensity
 irradiance
 length
 location
 luminance
 luminescence
 luster
 malleability
 magnetic field
 magnetic flux
 mass
 melting point
 moment
 momentum
 opacity
 permeability
 permittivity
 plasticity
 pressure
 radiance
 resistivity
 reflectivity
 refractive index
 spin
 solubility
 specific heat
 strength
 stiffness
 temperature
 tension
 thermal conductivity (and resistance)
 velocity
 viscosity
 volume
 wave impedance

See also
 List of materials properties
 Physical quantity
 Physical test
 Test method

References

Bibliography

External links
 Physical and Chemical Property Data Sources – a list of references which cover several chemical and physical properties of various materials

Physical quantities